Myrmele is a genus of spiders in the family Salticidae. It was first described in 2016 by Prószyński. , it contains 4 species, all from Madagascar.

References

Salticidae
Salticidae genera
Spiders of Madagascar